Scincella barbouri, also known commonly as Barbour's ground skink, is a species of lizard in the family Scincidae. The species is endemic to China.

Etymology
The specific name, barbouri, is in honor of American herpetologist Thomas Barbour.

Geographic range
S. barbouri is found in Yunnan province, southwestern China. It may possibly also occur in adjacent Sichuan province.

Habitat

Reproduction
S. barbouri is oviparous.

References

Further reading
Stejneger L (1925). "Description of a new scincid lizard and a new burrowing frog from China". Journal of the Washington Academy of Sciences 15: 150–152. (Leiolopisma barbouri, new species, pp. 150–151.

Scincella
Reptiles described in 1925
Taxa named by Leonhard Stejneger